Antony John "Tommy" Jaszczun (born 16 September 1977) is an English former professional footballer who played as a defender.

Career

Aston Villa
Born in Kettering, Northamptonshire, Jaszczun started his career as part of the Aston Villa youth team. He rarely managed to get into the first team setup, playing just once as a substitute in a League Cup tie with Chelsea, and was sold on to Blackpool for a fee believed to be £50,000.

Blackpool
Whilst at Blackpool he helped them win the Football League Trophy twice, starting both finals, in 2002 and 2004.

Cambridge United
Following a loan spell, Jaszczun joined Cambridge United in July 2006. However he was forced into retirement in March 2007 as he had been sidelined since November with a toe injury and has been unable to return to training despite an operation and prolonged rehabilitation.

Kettering Town
Jaszczun came out of early retirement to play for his hometown side, Kettering Town. He was manager Mark Cooper first signing in May 2007. However, after a successful first season, winning the Conference North, he had an injury plagued season the next, but still managed to feature against Fulham in the FA Cup. Jaszczun was released by the club in March 2009.

Corby Town
Following his release from Kettering Town, Jaszczun joined Conference North side Corby Town.

Kettering Town again
Jaszczun rejoined The Poppies for a second spell in May 2010 as a player coach. After just six months Jaszczun quit the club after he was asked to take a wage cut.

Corby Town again
On 17 January 2011, it was confirmed that Jaszczun had rejoined The Steelmen.

Whitworth 
In 2012 Jaszczun joined United Counties League side Wellingborough Whitworth as player/assistant manager. In January 2016 he became manager, but resigned at the end of the 2015–16 season.

References

External links

1977 births
Living people
Sportspeople from Kettering
English footballers
Association football defenders
Aston Villa F.C. players
Blackpool F.C. players
Northampton Town F.C. players
Rochdale A.F.C. players
Cambridge United F.C. players
Kettering Town F.C. players
Corby Town F.C. players
Daventry United F.C. players
Brackley Town F.C. players
Wellingborough Whitworth F.C. players
English Football League players
National League (English football) players
English football managers
Wellingborough Whitworth F.C. managers